August Ohmsen (March 15, 1854 – February 13, 1938) was a Master-at-Arms serving in the United States Navy who received the Medal of Honor for bravery.

Biography
Ohmsen was born March 15, 1854, in Lubeck, Germany and enlisted in the United States Navy on November 7, 1878, in Berwick, England.

Ohmsen began clearing the deck and  remained there until the water was waist deep, wading through it with outstretched arms waking up the men who were still asleep in their hammocks. Then, going on deck, he assisted in lowering the first cutter and then the dinghy, of which he took charge. For his actions on that night he received the Medal of Honor on October 18, 1884.

He was warranted as a boatswain on June 27, 1897, and promoted to chief boatswain on April 27, 1904.  He retired from the Navy on November 25, 1910.  During World War I he was recalled to active duty with the rank of lieutenant and was assigned to the Norfolk Navy Yard.

He died February 13, 1938, and is buried in Saint Pauls Cemetery Portsmouth, Virginia. His grave can be found in section B, lot 2.

Medal of Honor citation
Rank and organization: Master-at-Arms, U.S. Navy. Born: 1853, Germany. Accredited to: New York. G.O. No.: 326, 18 October 1884.

Citation:

On board the U.S.S. Tallapoosa at the time of the sinking of that vessel, on the night of 21 August 1884. Clearing the berth deck, Ohmsen remained there until the water was waist deep, wading about with outstretched arms, rousing the men out of their hammocks. Then, going on deck, he assisted in lowering the first cutter and then the dinghy, of which he took charge.

See also

List of Medal of Honor recipients during Peacetime

References

External links

1853 births
1938 deaths
United States Navy Medal of Honor recipients
United States Navy sailors
German emigrants to the United States
Military personnel from New York (state)
German-born Medal of Honor recipients
Non-combat recipients of the Medal of Honor
Military personnel from Lübeck